Princess Marie of Hesse and by Rhine (Marie Viktoria Feodore Leopoldine; 24 May 1874 – 16 November 1878) was a Hessian and Rhenish princess, a member of the House of Hesse-Darmstadt. She was the youngest child and fifth daughter of Louis IV, Grand Duke of Hesse and by Rhine, and Princess Alice of the United Kingdom. Her mother was the second daughter of Queen Victoria of the United Kingdom. Marie died of diphtheria and was buried with her mother, who died a few weeks later of the same disease.

Infancy
 
She had six older siblings, Victoria, Elizabeth, Irene, Ernest Louis, Frederick, and Alix.

Marie was known as "May" in the family. When she was a baby, her mother remarked in a letter that "little sister Maly" bore a strong resemblance to her dead brother Friedrich ("Frittie") at the same age "with such quick eyes and two deep dimples in her cheeks." A few weeks later, Alice wrote that baby "Maly" had fair skin, light brown hair and deep blue eyes. As she grew older, she smiled frequently and Alice thought she more strongly resembled her older sister Victoria, with "fair hair, marked eyebrows and speaking eyes." She and her sister Alix, two years older, "made a pretty contrast." Her mother thought her youngest child was "enchanting" and as a toddler the little girl called her mother "my 'weetheart." Alix was her constant companion. The two girls were dressed alike and shared the nursery. The family enjoyed a trip to the  seaside in the summer of 1877 and the two youngest girls were a source of delight to their mother. Sending photos taken then to her mother, Queen Victoria, Alice wrote that "May has not such fat cheeks in reality; still it is very dear. The two little girlies are so sweet, so dear, merry, and nice. I don't know which is dearest, they are both so captivating."

Diphtheria

Tragedy struck the grand ducal family in 1878. As her sister Victoria described the scene later, the family had been gathered together on the evening of 5 November when she developed a stiff neck. Victoria reported her symptoms to their mother, who thought it might be mumps and said it would be "comical" if they all caught it. Victoria felt well enough to read Alice in Wonderland to her younger siblings, while her mother sat nearby chatting with her friend Katie Macbean, who was filling in for an absent lady-in-waiting. Marie leaped up and begged her mother to let her have more cake. Her siblings asked Miss Macbean to play the piano so they could dance. They danced for half an hour and went to bed in high spirits.

The next morning Victoria was diagnosed with diphtheria; at three in the morning on 12 November, six-year-old Alix was diagnosed with the disease. Princess Alice ordered that a steam inhaler should be brought to her room to prevent the seriously ill Alix from choking to death. Hours later, Princess Marie ran into her mother's room, crawled into bed with her and kissed her. By afternoon, Marie as well was displaying the symptoms of the disease, suffering from a high fever. White spots and a white membrane covered the back of her throat. The next day her sister Irene became ill and on the day of 14 November her brother Ernest and father Louis also became ill with diphtheria. Alice and the doctors nursed the family round the clock. On the morning of 16 November, Marie choked to death from the membrane covering her throat. Her mother, awakened by the doctors, hurried to the nursery, only to find her daughter dead. Alice sat by her daughter's body, kissing Marie's face and hands, trying to work up the strength to tell her ill husband. She watched as Marie's coffin was wheeled off to the family mausoleum.

For weeks, Alice concealed Marie's death from the other sick children, who asked about her and tried to send their little sister toys. Elizabeth, who had been sent to stay with her paternal grandmother, was the only child who escaped infection. The sick children were finally told at the beginning of December that Marie had died. Ten-year-old Ernest at first refused to believe the news and then broke down in tears. His mother hugged and kissed him, despite the risk of infection. On 7 December Alice recognized the symptoms of diphtheria in herself. She died on the morning of 14 December, murmuring "From Friday to Saturday -- four weeks -- May -- dear Papa." (It was the anniversary of her own father's death.) Alice was interred  beside her daughter. A statue by Joseph Boehm was placed on the tomb of Alice holding Marie in her arms.

It is commonly believed that Marie's niece, Grand Duchess Maria Nikolaevna of Russia, the third daughter of Alix and her husband Nicholas II of Russia, was named for her and the Dowager Empress Maria Feodorovna of Russia.

Ancestry

See also
Maria Alexandrovna (Marie of Hesse)

Notes

References

Mager, Hugo (1998). Elizabeth: Grand Duchess of Russia. Carroll and Graf Publishers, Inc. 
Alice, Grand Duchess of Hesse, G.P. Putnam's Sons, 1885.

1874 births
1878 deaths
German princesses
House of Hesse-Darmstadt
Infectious disease deaths in Germany
Respiratory disease deaths in Germany
Deaths from diphtheria
Burials at the Mausoleum for the Grand Ducal House of Hesse, Rosenhöhe (Darmstadt)
Royalty and nobility who died as children
Daughters of monarchs